Christian Ditlev, Count of Reventlow (10 March 1710 – 30 March 1775) was a Danish Privy Councillor, nobleman and estate owner.

Reventlow was the third son of Christian Ditlev Reventlow and his wife Benedicte Margrethe von Brockdorff; as such, he was born into a family of significant influence and wealth. Furthermore, his paternal aunt was Anne Sophie Reventlow, morganatic wife of King Frederik IV of Denmark, and later Queen of Denmark. Despite his position, Reventlow devoted his life to his family and the maintenance of his estates, showing very little interest in life at court.

He married in 1737 Johanne Sophie Frederikke von Bothmer, a daughter of Reichsgraf Friedrich Johann von Bothmer (1658-1729), elder brother of Hans Caspar von Bothmer. Though he had little-to-no political influence, he fathered three of the most prominent members of the Reventlow family: Prime Minister Christian Ditlev Frederik Reventlow; ; and, saloniste Louise Stolberg.

He is buried in Gorslunde Church.

References 

1710 births
1775 deaths
Politicians from Copenhagen
Nobility from Copenhagen
18th-century Danish politicians
Christian Ditlev